Imad Hoballah is a Lebanese politician. From 21 January to 10 August 2020, he served as Minister of Industry in the cabinet led by Prime Minister Hassan Diab.

References 

Living people
Year of birth missing (living people)
Place of birth missing (living people)
Government ministers of Lebanon

Hezbollah politicians